Yuriy Vladimirovich Nazarov (born 5 May 1937) is a Soviet and Russian actor. People's Artist of Russia (2005).

Biography
He was born Yuriy Vladimirovich Nazarov in Novosibirsk, Russian SFSR, Soviet Union. His father, Nikolai Aldomirovich Nazarov (1906–1971), was an ethnic Chechen Lieutenant of the Red Army, who served in the Eastern Front and the Crimean offensive in 1944.

In 1989, Nazarov was nominated for a Nika Award as Best Actor in the film Little Vera playing Vera's father. Nazarov has appeared in the cinema of Russia since 1954. His last appearance was in Apostol, a TV miniseries.

In his book "Not Only About Cinema" he describes himself as a communist.

In March 2014 Nazarov signed a letter in support of the policies of Russian President Vladimir Putin regarding Ukraine and Crimea. Crimea is since March 2014 under dispute by Russia and Ukraine.

Filmography
Yuriy Nazarov has starred in over 257 films and television productions.

References

External links
 

1937 births
Living people
20th-century Russian male actors
21st-century Russian male actors
Honored Artists of the RSFSR
People's Artists of Russia
Actors from Novosibirsk
Russian communists
Russian male film actors
Russian male stage actors
Russian male television actors
Soviet male film actors
Soviet male stage actors
Soviet male television actors